Jean-Marc Fournier (born October 7, 1959) is a Quebec politician and a lawyer. He represented the riding of Saint-Laurent in the National Assembly of Quebec from 2010 to 2018, and previously represented the riding of Châteauguay from 1994 to 2008. He served as the Minister of Revenue, Government House Leader, Minister of Education, Minister of Municipal Affairs, and Attorney General in the Government of Jean Charest and was the interim leader of the Quebec Liberal Party from 2012 to 2013

Early career

Fournier was born in Châteauguay, Quebec. He studied at the Université de Montréal and obtained a law degree and later a master's degree in public law. He was admitted to the Barreau du Québec in 1982. He practiced law for nearly ten years. He later worked at the offices of the Ministry of Governmental Affairs, Employment and Justice.

He was also a radio host at community radio station CHAI-FM and was an organizer of the 1986 Quebec Winter Games. He was also the president of the Chateauguay Chamber of Commerce and was named Outstanding Citizen in 1987 by the city.

Prior to his entry in provincial politics, Fournier was the defeated candidate of the Liberal Party of Canada in Châteauguay in 1988 and was also involved in the leadership campaign of Paul Martin for Leader of the Liberal Party of Canada in which Jean Chrétien eventually won.

Quebec National Assembly

Fournier won the 1994 election and was subsequently re-elected in the 1998, 2003 and 2007 elections. Before the Quebec Liberal Party took power in the 2003 election, Fournier at various moments served as the chief whip of the official opposition, critic for Canadian intergovernmental affairs, as well as critic for health.

After his 2003 re-election, he was named the Minister of Municipal Affairs, Sports and Recreation and from 2005 to 2007, he was the Minister of Education, Leisure and Sports for Quebec, Canada.  Fournier replaced Pierre Reid in the midst of the 2005 Quebec student protests in which over 200 000 college and university students protested the Liberals cuts in bursary funds in the 2004 budget. Fournier and the students groups settled a deal in April 2005 which included involvement from the federal government and its bursary program.

On October 31, 2008, Fournier announced he would retire from politics.  On November 17, 2009, it was announced Fournier would join the Office of the Leader of the Opposition, Michael Ignatieff, as principal secretary.

On August 9, 2010 it was announced that Fournier would run in a by-election in the district of Saint-Laurent to replace Jacques Dupuis, who was retiring from provincial politics.  Two days later, Fournier was appointed the Minister of Justice and the Reform of Democratic Institutions by Premier Jean Charest as part of a wider cabinet shuffle, despite his not yet holding a seat in the National Assembly. He was reelected by a wide margin on September 13, 2010.

Following large student protests opposing tuition increases, Fournier supported the passage of Bill 78, a Quebec law drafted in response to the protests. After student groups vowed civil disobedience to oppose the law, Fournier declared the practice "a nice word for vandalism."

On September 12, 2012, Fournier was named interim Leader of the Quebec Liberal Party, replacing Jean Charest.

Electoral record (partial)

References

ă==External links==
 

1959 births
Lawyers in Quebec
Living people
Members of the Executive Council of Quebec
People from Châteauguay
Quebec Liberal Party MNAs
Collège de Montréal alumni
Université de Montréal alumni
21st-century Canadian politicians